was a Japanese judge who was a member of the Supreme Court of Japan.

He is notable in Japan for his contributions to bankruptcy law.

References

Supreme Court of Japan justices
1943 births
2016 deaths